Recently may refer to:

Recently (album), by Joan Baez
Recently (EP), by Dave Matthews Band